Hemitrullus is a genus of crickets in the family Gryllidae and tribe Gryllini.  Species can be found in Indo-China.

Species 
Hemitrullus includes the following species:
subgenus Atrullus Gorochov, 2001
 Hemitrullus banlungi Gorochov, 2001
subgenus Hemitrullus Gorochov, 2001
 Hemitrullus changi Gorochov, 2001- type species - locality: Trat, Ko Chang, Thailand
subgenus Peratrullus Gorochov, 2001
 Hemitrullus alboapex Gorochov, 2001
 Hemitrullus nigroapex Gorochov, 2001
 Hemitrullus perspicillaris Ingrisch, 1987

References

External links
 

Ensifera genera
Gryllinae
Orthoptera of Indo-China